Alan Franco may refer to:

Alan Franco (footballer, born 1996), Argentine football centre-back for Atlanta United
Alan Franco (footballer, born 1998), Ecuadorian football midfielder for Atlético Mineiro